Group 2 consisted of four of the 32 teams entered into the European zone: England, Finland, Italy, and Luxembourg. These four teams competed on a home-and-away basis for one of the 8.5 spots in the final tournament allocated to the European zone, with the group's winner claiming the spot.

Standings

Matches

Notes

External links 
Group 2 Detailed Results at RSSSF

2
1976–77 in English football
1977–78 in English football
1976 in Finnish football
1977 in Finnish football
1976–77 in Italian football
1977–78 in Italian football
1976–77 in Luxembourgian football
1977–78 in Luxembourgian football